The saddlepoint approximation method, initially proposed by  Daniels (1954) is a specific example of the mathematical  saddlepoint  technique applied to statistics. It provides a highly accurate approximation formula for any PDF or probability mass function of a distribution, based on the  moment generating function. There is also a formula for the  CDF  of the distribution, proposed by Lugannani and Rice (1980).

Definition 

 
and the saddlepoint approximation to the CDF is defined as:

When the distribution is that of a sample mean, Lugannani and Rice's saddlepoint expansion for the cumulative distribution function  may be differentiated to obtain Daniels' saddlepoint expansion for the probability density function  (Routledge and Tsao, 1997). This result establishes the derivative of a truncated Lugannani and Rice series as an alternative asymptotic approximation for the density function .

References 

 
 
 
 
 
 

Asymptotic analysis
Perturbation theory